Alder Lake is a  long reservoir on the Nisqually River in Eatonville, Washington in the U.S. state of Washington, which was created by the construction of Alder Dam by Tacoma Power in September 1944.  At the very eastern end of the lake is the town of Elbe, Washington. 

The name of the lake recalls the former small town of Alder, which was flooded in 1945 by the impounded water of the lake and disappeared. The extinct town, in turn, was named for alder trees near the original site. The current community of Alder is located north of the lake.

In 2021, Intel named it's new microarchitecture after Alder Lake.

See also
 List of lakes in Washington
 Alder Lake (microarchitecture)

References 

Lakes of Lewis County, Washington
Lakes of Pierce County, Washington
Lakes of Thurston County, Washington
Reservoirs in Washington (state)
Protected areas of Pierce County, Washington
Tacoma Public Utilities